All Your Fault: Pt. 1 is the second EP by American singer Bebe Rexha. It was released on February 17, 2017. It features guest appearances from G-Eazy and Ty Dolla $ign. The album's lead single, "I Got You", was released on October 28, 2016.

Release and promotion
"I Got You" officially served as the lead single and was released on October 28, 2016. The music video debuted on January 6, 2017 and has accumulated a total of 310 million views as of January 1, 2020. The song entered the Billboard Hot 100 chart at number 94 on the issue dated January 21, 2017. It has since peaked at number 43. The music video for the song "F.F.F.", directed by Emil Nava, premiered on Entertainment Weeklys website on March 9, 2017. "Bad Bitch" was temporarily added to prominent playlists on Spotify and Apple Music.

Rexha embarked on her first headlining concert tour, All Your Fault Tour in support of it. The tour aired in North America, Asia, and Europe, which began on March 1, 2017 and lasted until May 18, 2017.

Critical reception

Mike Wass of the music blog Idolator gave the EP four-and-a-half stars out of five, calling it "a testament to her [Rexha's] brilliant songwriting and supernatural ability to sniff out a hook".

Track listing
Credits taken from Qobuz.

Notes
 contains a vocal producer.
 contains an additional producer.

Other credits
Lindsey Stirling is a violinist on "Small Doses".

Personnel
Credits adapted from the liner notes of All Your Fault: Pt. 1.

Performers and musicians

Bebe Rexha – vocals
G-Eazy – rap 
Ty Dolla Sign – rap 
Sarah Button – violin 
Captain Cuts – all instruments 
Katherine Chibah – viola 
Reiad Chibah – violin 
Louise Dearsley – cello 
The Invisible Men – keyboards 
Maths Time Joy – keyboards 
Alex Oriet – keyboards 
David Phelan – keyboards 

Production

Mitch Allan – vocal production , mixing 
Jose Balabuer – engineering 
Captain Cuts – production , programming , engineering 
Robin Florent – mix assistant 
Chris Galland – mix engineering 
Chris Gehringer – mastering 
Gladius – production 
Josh Gudwin – mixing 
The Invisible Men – production , recording , programming 
Jeff Jackson – mix assistant 
Omar Loya – recording 
Manny Marroquin – mixing 
Maths Time Joy – additional production , programming 
Zeke Mishanec – mix assistant 
Daniel Moyler – recording 
Alex Oriet – programming 
David Phelan – programming 
Scott Robinson – additional vocal production 
David Rodriguez – engineering 
Stargate – production 
Phil Tan – mixing 
Kory Welty – mix assistant 
Salt Wives – production 
The Wiild – production 
Bill Zimmerman – additional/assistant engineering 

Design and management

The 92 Group – creative direction
Blast!Music Management – management 
Sasha Samsonova – photography

Charts

Release history

References

2017 EPs
Albums produced by Stargate
Bebe Rexha albums
Warner Records EPs